Mauro Racca (3 April 1912 – 27 April 1977) was an Italian fencer. He won two silver medals in the team sabre events at the 1948 and 1952 Summer Olympics.

References

1912 births
1977 deaths
Italian male fencers
Olympic fencers of Italy
Fencers at the 1948 Summer Olympics
Fencers at the 1952 Summer Olympics
Olympic silver medalists for Italy
Sportspeople from Turin
Olympic medalists in fencing
Medalists at the 1948 Summer Olympics
Medalists at the 1952 Summer Olympics
Mediterranean Games silver medalists for Italy
Mediterranean Games medalists in fencing
Fencers at the 1951 Mediterranean Games